Eddie Kelly (born 1939 in Enniscorthy, County Wexford, Ireland) is an Irish retired sportsperson.  He played hurling with his local club St Aidan's and was a member of the Wexford senior inter-county team from 1960 until 1969.

References

1939 births
Living people
All-Ireland Senior Hurling Championship winners
St Aidan's hurlers
Wexford inter-county hurlers